For the 1986 Vuelta a España, the field consisted of 170 riders; 107 finished the race.

By rider

By nationality

References

1986 Vuelta a España
1986